Styków  is a village which was until 31 December 2020 in the administrative district of Gmina Głogów Małopolski, within Rzeszów County, Subcarpathian Voivodeship, in south-eastern Poland. From 1 January 2021 it became part of the town of Głogów Małopolski. It is located of the Łęg River in the heartland of the Sandomierz Basin.

The village has a population of 845 (2011).

References

Villages in Rzeszów County
Neighbourhoods in Poland